Protoleptoneta is a genus of  leptonetids that was first described by C. Deltshev in 1972.

Species
 it contains four species:
Protoleptoneta baccettii (Brignoli, 1979) – Italy
Protoleptoneta beroni Deltshev, 1977 – Bulgaria
Protoleptoneta bulgarica Deltshev, 1972 (type) – Bulgaria
Protoleptoneta italica (Simon, 1907) – France, Italy, Austria

See also
 List of Leptonetidae species

References

Araneomorphae genera
Leptonetidae